This is a list of films produced in Sweden and in the Swedish language in the 1950s. For an A-Z see :Category:Swedish films.

1950

1951

1952

1953

1954

1955

1956

1957

1958

1959

See also
 List of Danish films of the 1950s

External links
 Swedish film at the Internet Movie Database

1950s
Swedish
Films

nl:Lijst van Zweedse films
zh:瑞典電影列表